This is a list of notable individuals and organizations who have voiced their endorsement of CANZUK, the deepening of ties between Canada, Australia, New Zealand, and the United Kingdom.

Australia

Senators
Eric Abetz, Liberal Senator for Tasmania
James Paterson, Liberal Senator for Victoria

Organisations
Australian Taxpayers' Alliance

Canada

Parties
The Conservative Party of Canada, a federal political party in Canada

MPs
Andrew Scheer, Leader of the Official Opposition 2017–2020, MP for Regina—Qu'Appelle
Dean Allison, Official Opposition Critic for International Trade since 2017, MP for Niagara West
Ed Fast, Official Opposition Critic for the Environment since 2015, MP for Abbotsford 
Erin O'Toole, Leader of the Official Opposition from 2020 to 2022, MP for Durham
John Brassard, Deputy Opposition Whip since 2017, MP for Barrie—Innisfil
Kelly McCauley, Opposition Deputy Critic for Public Services and Procurement since 2018, MP for Edmonton West
Lisa Raitt, the Conservative Party deputy leader since 2017, MP for Milton
Michael Chong, Shadow Minister for Infrastructure, Communities and Urban Affairs since 2017, MP for Wellington—Halton Hills
Peter Kent, Official Opposition Critic for Ethics since 2017, MP for Thornhill
Todd Doherty, Opposition Critic for Fisheries & Oceans since 2017, MP for Cariboo—Prince George
Stephanie Kusie, MP for Calgary Midnapore

New Zealand

Parties
ACT New Zealand, a right-wing, classical-liberal political party in New Zealand

MPs
David Seymour, Leader of ACT New Zealand, MP for Epsom
Simon Bridges, then Leader of the Opposition, MP for Tauranga

Former MPs
Winston Peters, former Deputy Prime Minister of New Zealand, Minister of Foreign Affairs, former MP for New Zealand First List

Academics
Noel Cox, lawyer, legal scholar, and Anglican priest

United Kingdom

Parties
British Unionist Party, a Scottish unionist political party
Libertarian Party, a libertarian political party

 Liberal Party 

Conservative and Unionist Party, a centre right political party

Current MPs
Andrew Rosindell, MP for Romford
Paul Bristow, MP for Peterborough
Bill Grant, MP for Ayr, Carrick and Cumnock
Bob Seely, MP for Isle of Wight
Boris Johnson, MP for Uxbridge and South Ruislip, former Mayor of London, former Prime Minister of the United Kingdom from 2019-2022.
John Redwood, MP for Wokingham
Michael Fabricant, MP for Lichfield Katherine Fletcher, MP for South Ribble

Former MPs
David Howell, former Secretary of State for Energy, for Transport, Minister of State in the Foreign Office, former MP for Guildford
Julian Brazier, former MP for Canterbury from 1987 to 2017

Former MEPs
Daniel Hannan, Conservative MEP for South East England and founder of Vote Leave 
Emma McClarkin, outgoing Conservative MEP for East Midlands
Jonathan Arnott, outgoing Brexit Party MEP for North East England

Mayors
Ben Houchen, Conservative Mayor of the Tees Valley

Lords Temporal
Conrad Black, former newspaper publisher

Academics
Andrew Roberts, historian, journalist, and visiting professor at the Department of War Studies, King's College London and a Lehrman Institute Distinguished Lecturer at the New York Historical Society
Jeremy Black, historian and a professor of history
Madsen Pirie, researcher and author
Sean Frost, Scientist and lecturer

Journalists
John O'Sullivan, conservative political commentator, journalist, and a senior policywriter and speechwriter in 10 Downing Street for Margaret Thatcher
Tim Montgomerie, political activist, blogger, and columnist

Organisations
Adam Smith Institute
The Bruges Group
Institute of Economic Affairs
Royal Commonwealth Society
The Freedom Association
Conservatives for CANZUK

International

Academics
Derrick Gosselin, chairman of the Belgian Nuclear Research Center SCK-CEN, vice chairman of the von Karman Institute for Fluid Dynamics, fellow of the Royal Academy of Belgium

Activists
Maajid Nawaz, author and founder of the Quilliam Foundation think-tank.

Journalists
James C. Bennett, fellow at the Hudson Institute
Roger Kimball, editor and publisher of The New Criterion

Organisations
CANZUK International

References

Notes

Citations 

Freedom of movement
Political endorsements in Canada
Political endorsements in the United Kingdom
CANZUK